Graham McPherson (born 13 January 1961), known primarily by his stage name Suggs, is an English singer-songwriter, musician, radio personality and actor from Hastings, England. 

In a music career spanning 40 years, he came to prominence in the late 1970s as the lead singer of the ska band Madness, which released fifteen singles that entered the top 10 charts in the United Kingdom during the 1970s, 1980s and 1990s, including "My Girl", "Baggy Trousers", "Embarrassment", "It Must Be Love", "House of Fun", "Driving in My Car", "Our House", "Wings of a Dove" and "Lovestruck". Suggs began his solo career in 1995, while still a member of Madness. Since then, he has released two studio albums and two compilation albums. His solo hits include "I'm Only Sleeping", "Camden Town", "Cecilia" and "Blue Day".

Suggs has also been an actor, with roles in films, theatre and television. He is married and is the father of two children.

Early life
Graham McPherson was born on 13 January 1961 in Hastings to a Scottish father, William Rutherford McPherson (1935–1975) and Welsh mother, jazz singer Edith Gower. The couple had married in the Paddington area of London in 1960 and Suggs was raised in Hastings by his mother. His father had left by the time Suggs was three. In a 2009 interview, before learning that his father had died decades ago, Suggs responded when asked about what happened to him:

I don't know, but what I've heard hasn't been good: heroin, injecting his eyeballs with paraffin, being sectioned. He must be dead now. I mean, he would have got in touch if he was alive, wouldn't he? Yeah, he must be dead, poor bugger.

Suggs spent three years of his childhood in his mother's hometown of Haverfordwest, Wales and had just started at a grammar school there when his mother moved to London. He then went to the Quintin Kynaston comprehensive school at St John's Wood. On the official Madness website, he has stated:

I was born in Hastings on a stormy evening on 13 January 1961. I only lived with my mum, so we were free agents. She was a singer in the pubs and clubs. We moved to Liverpool then London. I lived with relations in Wales for a while and came back to London. Because I was an only child, I was pretty insular and stubborn. All the upheaval made me lazy academically, so by the time I got to Quintin Kynaston school in St John's Wood I didn't bother much, I stayed onto the sixth form for social security reasons, and got two O-levels and a CSE on the way. I met Mike Barson hanging around Hampstead School.

Suggs got his nickname from randomly sticking a pin in an encyclopaedia of jazz musicians (hitting Peter Suggs) while he was still in school, to avoid being labelled as the member of an ethnic minority owing to his Scottish name. To capitalise on the name he went as far as to create a myth about it, writing lines like "Suggs is our leader" on the walls and only answering to that name.

After leaving school, he worked at a butcher's shop for eight months, his first proper job.  He also worked as a painter and decorator. The first gig he went to was the Who supported by the Sensational Alex Harvey Band in 1976.

Career
In 1976 Mike Barson, Chris Foreman and Lee Thompson formed the North London Invaders, which later became the band Madness. The original members recruited were John Hasler, Cathal Smyth and vocalist Dikran Tulaine. This six-piece line-up was stable until 1977, when Suggs took over the lead vocals and Tulaine left the band. After a decline in hits, the band broke up in 1986.  Suggs has said that he felt "a bit lost" after the band split up, and he saw a psychotherapist on four occasions.

Solo career
After Madness' reformation for Madstock! in 1992 and 1994, Suggs went to work on his first solo album with the production help of reggae producers Sly and Robbie. In 1995 The Lone Ranger was released on Warner Music and peaked on the UK Albums Chart at No. 14. The first single to be released from the album was a cover of the Beatles song "I'm Only Sleeping" entering the UK Top 10 at No. 7. Its music video featured appearances from Madness bandmates Mike Barson and Chas Smash. This was followed by "Camden Town", a homage to Suggs's favourite part of London, which reached No. 14 in the UK.

In December of that year, Suggs released The Christmas E.P. featuring his song "The Tune" (co-written with Mike Barson) plus covers of "Sleigh Ride" and "Alright" by Supergrass. In 1996 the third single from the album, a version of the Simon & Garfunkel song "Cecilia", became his most successful release, peaking at No. 4 in the UK and being certified silver by the British Phonographic Industry. The final single to be released from the album was "No More Alcohol", charting at No. 24.

In 1997, Suggs recorded the song "Blue Day" for Chelsea F.C. with Chelsea players. It was the official song for the team for the FA Cup, which Chelsea eventually won. The song reached No. 22 in the UK charts.

In 1998, Suggs released his second solo album, The Three Pyramids Club, on Warner Music, which was produced by Steve Lironi. The first and only single to be released was "I Am" charting at No. 38 in the UK. The song was also featured on the soundtrack to The Avengers. The album includes a collaboration with reggae artist General Levy and the trombone talents of ska legend Rico Rodriguez.

After completing his solo releases, Suggs returned to work with Madness on their first original album in fourteen years. Wonderful was released in 1999 and was followed by the cover album The Dangermen Sessions Vol. 1 in 2005. In 2009, Madness released The Liberty of Norton Folgate which reached No. 5 in the UK Album Charts.

Suggs – The Platinum Collection was released on 30 July 2007 on Warner Music, featuring a selection of Suggs best tracks from his two solo albums along with "Blue Day" and a remixed version of "Cecilia".

In 2008, Suggs contributed vocals to a cover of Al Bowlly's "Hang Out the Stars in Indiana" for the soundtrack for The Edge of Love composed by Angelo Badalamenti. Suggs also made a cameo in the film, singing the track.

Musical collaborations
Suggs worked with Morrissey between 1989 and 1990, singing backing vocals on the tracks "Piccadilly Palare" and "Sing Your Life". From early 1990 to 1992, he co-managed The Farm and co-produced their first album Spartacus which reached number-one in the UK Album Charts and spawned the international hit "All Together Now". He also produced their first single "Hearts and Minds" in 1984.

Suggs has collaborated with Jools Holland twice on his Small World Big Band albums, firstly in 2001 with the song "Oranges and Lemons Again" and then with "Jack O the Green" in 2003. He also played with Holland and his Rhythm and Blues Orchestra in 2003 for a television special where they performed two songs with veteran ska singer Prince Buster.

In July 2005, shortly after the terrorist attacks in London, Suggs and Chas Smash performed the Bob Marley song "So Much Trouble in the World" with Billy Bragg at a concert in London's Brockwell Park in aid of the victims. Also in 2005, Suggs collaborated with electronic group Audio Bullys on the track "This Road" from their top 40 album Generation. In 2006, Suggs performed the Madness song "My Girl" with the Ordinary Boys at the Brixton Academy which was released as a B-side on their UK hit single "Nine2five".

In May 2008, Suggs and Chas Smash joined the Pet Shop Boys on stage at a gig in London's Heaven nightclub where they performed a dance version of the Madness song "My Girl". In 2010, Suggs and Mike Barson again worked with the Audio Bullys on their album Higher Than the Eiffel. They appear on the tracks "Twist Me Up" and "Goodbye".

Film and theatre
Suggs has acted in films such as The Tall Guy and Don't Go Breaking My Heart (1998). He starred in the Channel 4 drama The Final Frame (1990), in which he played a pop star named East. He also played a pop star (called Jason Wood) in the Press Gang episode "Friends Like These" in 1990. Suggs also appeared in the 2008 romantic drama The Edge of Love starring Keira Knightley and Sienna Miller, playing the part of "the crooner" (also credited as Al Bowlly) and singing Bowlly's hit "Hang Out the Stars in Indiana".

In late 2011, Suggs began a nationwide UK tour of a new one man stage show entitled "LIVESUGGS". In the show, Suggs shared various anecdotes from his childhood to the present day, intertwined with musical numbers. The show was well received by critics.

In 2003, Suggs appeared as Joe's dad in the stage musical Our House, featuring the songs of Madness, for a limited run in London's West End. The show then ran at Isis Prison, Woolwich. In November 2012, Suggs reprised his role of Joe's dad in the 10th Anniversary Concert of the musical Our House in aid of Help for Heroes.

Radio
Suggs was a principal and original DJ on BBC Radio 6 Music when it launched in March 2002. He worked with Bob Monkhouse on the BBC Radio 4 musical sitcom I Think I've Got a Problem, also starring comedian Phil Cornwell and written by Andrew McGibbon.

He became a DJ on Virgin Radio with the show Virgin Party Classics, and was nominated for a Radio Academy Award in 2005. In 2006, Virgin launched the Party Classics radio channel, available via digital television. The channel was hosted by Suggs, but was short-lived, pulled just four months after it launched. He regularly featured on Virgin Radio competitions where listeners could win the chance to meet him and have a drink with him. On one such occasion, well-known children's book writer Simon I. Boy chatted about pop records that Suggs was pleased he had no connection with, particularly a 1974 Decca recording entitled Name It You Got It by Micky Moonshine. The year 2007 saw him presenting a new show on the station five days a week entitled Afternoon Tea with Suggs which ran every weekday afternoon between 14:0016:00. In August 2007, the show was given an extra hour and was on every weekday 13:0016:00. It was produced by Mark Bingham, and the promotion of the show was voiced by Brian Sewell.

On 3 December, Suggs quit Virgin and Neil Francis took over his weekday afternoon slot with immediate effect. On 27 September, Suggs and Madness closed down Regent Street to perform for Absolute Radio's first birthday. On 2 May 2013, he appeared on the "Cultural Exchange" feature of the BBC Radio 4 series Front Row, where he nominated a poem by John Betjeman ("On a Portrait of a Deaf Man"), as a piece of art work which he had found particularly meaningful.

Television
Suggs appeared twice with Madness on the British TV comedy show The Young Ones, first on the episode titled "Boring" in which the band performed "House of Fun". On the second series, the band performed "Our House" on the penultimate episode "Sick".

Suggs has hosted a celebrity karaoke game show on the UK's Channel 5, titled Night Fever. He was a team captain in the BBC music trivia game show A Question of Pop, hosted by Jamie Theakston, opposite Noddy Holder. Suggs has also appeared as a guest on the BBC Two show Never Mind the Buzzcocks.

He has co-presented two series of sixty-minute programmes called Salvage Squad, one restoring a Model T Ford, and one restoring a Ruston-Bucyrus 10RB in which a group of engineers restored rare old machinery. Some other items restored included a steamroller, a ploughing engine called "Margaret", a Blackpool "Coronation" tram, a Scammell Mechanical Horse, a Revopak garbage truck, various boats, World War II tanks, early C20 motor launches, railway locomotives and vintage cars.

In 2005, he filmed a series called Disappearing London for ITV in the London area, in which he investigated architectural and other curiosities that are vanishing. The series won three Royal Television Society awards with Suggs winning the award for "Presenter of the Year". A second series was filmed in 2006 for transmission in early 2007. In 2005 he filmed a similar one-off programme for the BBC entitled A Picture of London by Suggs, which featured the newly penned song "Cracks in the Pavement". Suggs has twice been a guest presenter on the BBC's long-running chart show Top of the Pops, once in 1995 and again in 2005.

In 2006, Suggs was the main presenter of the BBC London series Inside Out, a weekly programme for Londoners looking at surprising stories in the capital. He was part of Declan Donnelly's Boy Band on Ant & Dec's Saturday Night Takeaway the same year and performed "It Only Takes a Minute" by Take That.

In 2007, Suggs starred in a series of Birds Eye commercials which feature the Madness song "Our House". A popular online game featuring Suggs was also based on the commercials. In December 2007, he narrated a one-off documentary for ITV on the London music venue the Hammersmith Palais, which had closed down in 2007. The programme was broadcast on BBC Four on Christmas Eve.

In February 2008, Teachers TV broadcast Suggs in a one-off "Teaching Challenge". The challenge required Suggs to return to his secondary school, Quintin Kynaston School in North London, and teach a music lesson to a group of GCSE students. In this lesson he was assisted by renowned vocalist Paul Curtis, his voice coach Been Cross and his valet S.I. Boy. The class performed Curtis's "Name It You Got It". Also in 2008, he presented his own chat show titled Suggs in the City. The show, set in the Soho members club The Colony Room, aired on ITV London on Thursday nights. In October 2008, he presented a new culture series called Suggs' Italian Job which was aired on Sky Arts, following the singer around Italy's most culturally significant hot spots.

In 2009, Suggs performed with Zoë Ball in Let's Dance For Comic Relief dancing to "You Can Never Tell" from Pulp Fiction but was eliminated. He also appeared in an episode of Australian music quiz show Spicks and Specks on 15 April that year.

In 2015, Suggs appeared as a panelist on QI, in series L episode 15.

In 2016, he performed with Madness on the ITV comedy Benidorm (TV Series)

In 2017 and 2018, Suggs presented two series of the archaeology programme WW2 Treasure Hunters alongside detectorist Stephen Taylor on the TV channel HISTORY. During one episode, the team excavated a Covenanter tank, which had been buried in the chalky soil of Denbies Wine Estate near Dorking, Surrey for over 70 years. The tank was displayed at the vineyard for six months, before being removed for restoration. The second series, which began in November 2018, included a special WW1 episode.

In 2021, Suggs returned to present on Channel 5, when MTV Studios in London produced a three hour video countdown for the channel known as The 80s & 90s Mega Mix (on My5), with Suggs presenting the 1980s lists (Vernon Kay hosted the rundowns from the 1990s). The programmes with Suggs were originally broadcast on a Sunday afternoon over the summer, before the series was taken from the schedule and moved to a Friday night slot in September.

Other work

Charity
Suggs is a patron of the charity Children in Need, and has frequently appeared on the annual television fundraiser, performing various Madness tracks with other celebrities. Following the death of his sister-in-law Alanah in 2012 from pancreatic cancer, he organised a fundraising night for Pancreatic Cancer UK called An Evening with Suggs and Friends. Another event was held at Porchester Hall in London in March 2014. A third charity gala took place in March 2015.

Useless Information Society
Suggs is a member of the Useless Information Society (founded 1995), a society of journalists, writers and entertainers which focuses on esoteric information and has released books such as The Book of Useless Information. Other members include or have included Keith Waterhouse, Richard Littlejohn, Noel Botham, Ken Stott and Brian Hitchen.

Books
In August 2009 Suggs published his first book, Suggs and the City: My Journeys Through Disappearing London, which is partly based on his TV series Disappearing London. In October 2013 Suggs released his autobiography, Suggs: That Close.

Personal life
In 2012, Suggs learnt of his father's 1975 death through reading his own Wikipedia entry. 

In August 2012, he appeared at the Queen's Hall in Edinburgh as part of the Festival Fringe. In his show "Suggs: My Life Story in Word and Music", he talked about his early life and his search to find out more information about his father. He referenced his Wikipedia entry and stated that some published information relating to his early life was untrue, adding that he would get bored in interviews and make things up. He confirmed that although he was born in Hastings, the family moved around and he spent much of his early life in Wales. He stated that his father left when Suggs was three, not before he was born.

Suggs is married to singer Bette Bright, who is the vocalist of the 1970s British band Deaf School. They met through their connection with Clive Langer, married in 1981 and formerly lived in Holloway. They have two daughters, Scarlett and Viva. Suggs also owns a holiday home in the Italian countryside.

Suggs is a fan of Chelsea F.C., made apparent by the FA Cup related song "Blue Day" which he wrote and then performed along with the rest of the 1996–1997 Chelsea squad. This has also caused the Madness track "One Step Beyond" to be played at Chelsea matches.

Discography

Albums
 The Lone Ranger (16 October 1995) – UK No. 14 (BPI: Silver)
 The Three Pyramids Club (7 September 1998) – UK No. 82
 The Platinum Collection (30 July 2007)

Singles

 Both "Cecilia" and "No More Alcohol" feature uncredited vocals by Louchie Lou & Michie One

Other appearances

References

External links
Suggs personal website
Madness official website
Madness Central
Website for Suggs autobiography "That Close"

The Madness Information Service Online

Camden Town, Home of Madness

 
1961 births
Living people
Musicians from Hastings
Madness (band) members
20th-century English male singers
20th-century English singers
21st-century English male singers
21st-century English singers
English male singer-songwriters
Anglo-Scots
English people of Scottish descent
Virgin Radio (UK)
English radio personalities
English radio DJs
English record producers
English pop singers
Male new wave singers
English new wave musicians
British ska musicians
People educated at Quintin Kynaston School
English autobiographers